Events from the year 2009 in Pakistan.

Incumbents

Federal government
President: Asif Ali Zardari 
Prime Minister: Yousaf Raza Gillani 
Chief Justice: Abdul Hameed Dogar (until 21 March), Iftikhar Muhammad Chaudhry (starting 21 March)

Governors
Governor of Balochistan – Nawab Zulfikar Ali Magsi
Governor of Gilgit-Baltistan – Qamar Zaman Kaira (starting 16 September)
Governor of Khyber Pakhtunkhwa – Owais Ahmed Ghani 
Governor of Punjab – Salmaan Taseer
Governor of Sindh – Ishrat-ul-Ibad Khan

Events

February 
 20 February, A suicide bombing in Dera Ismail Khan killed 32 while injured 157 people.

March
 3 March, The Sri Lankan cricket team are attacked in the city of Lahore.
 6 March, Investigators in Pakistan are tracking down members of Lashkar-e-Taiba in the search for the perpetrators of the Lahore attack.
 16 March, Prime Minister Yousaf Raza Gillani addressed the nation, restoring the deposed Chief Justice Iftikhar Muhammad Chaudhry and other judges.
 27 March, a bomb attack in the FATA kills at least 48.
 30 March, Unidentified gunmen attacked and seized the Manawan Police Academy, which is based in Lahore. At least 18 people were later killed and around 95 others injured in the subsequent storming of the building by the Pakistani security forces.

April
 2009 refugee crisis in Pakistan

July
 On July 3, 2009, Taliban militants Saturday claimed responsibility for a military helicopter crash that killed 41 people in the rugged tribal area in the country's north. However, a military spokesman rejected the claim, reiterating that the helicopter had crashed due to a 'technical fault.' 41 security personnel, including 19 personnel of the paramilitary Frontier Crops, 18 regulars from the army and four crew members, on board a military transport helicopter were killed when it crashed in Chapri Ferozkhel area on the border of Khyber and Orakzai tribal regions on Friday afternoon.

August
 1 August, The 2009 Gojra riots began. Militant Islamists attacked Pakistan's Christian minority in a massive anti-Christian pogrom.

October
 October 5, five people were killed when a suicide bomber dressed in military fatigues walked through the security cordon at the World Food Program offices of the United Nations in Islamabad.
 October 9, in the busiest bazaar in Peshawar, the capital of the Khyber Pakhtunkhwa province, militants set off a car bomb that killed 48 people.
 October 11, 10 militants dressed in army fatigues and armed with automatic weapons, mines, grenades and suicide jackets breached the perimeter of the army headquarters in Rawalpindi in a raid that left 23 people dead and set off a 20-hour siege.
 October 12, militants launched their fourth assault in a week on strategic targets across Pakistan, this time with a suicide car bombing against a military vehicle in a crowded market in the northwest, killing 41 people and wounding dozens more.

December

December 29 – A bombing occurs during the main Jaloos in Karachi in which the Shias were mourning over the Day of Ashura. 43 persons were killed while almost 60 persons were injured.

Deaths
20 November – Ghulam Mustafa Jatoi, politician (born 1931)

See also
2008 in Pakistan
Other events of 2009
2010 in Pakistan
Timeline of Pakistani history
2009 in Pakistani television
List of Pakistani films of 2009

References

 
Pakistan
Years of the 21st century in Pakistan
2000s in Pakistan